Naranarayan Setu (IPA - nərəˈna:ra:jənə ˈseɪtu:) is the third bridge to have been constructed over the Brahmaputra River in Assam, India. It is a double-deck bridge with a railway track on the lower deck and a road on the upper deck. It has a length of 2.284 kilometres and connects Jogighopa, a town of Bongaigaon District on the north with Pancharatna, a town of Goalpara District on the south. The bridge was inaugurated on 15 April 1998 by Atal Bihari Vajpayee, the Prime Minister of India at that time. Construction was carried out by the consortium of The Braithwaite Burn and Jessop Construction Company Limited(BBJ). The approximate cost of construction of this bridge is Rs. 301 crore. This bridge is located on route of National Highway 17, erstwhile route NH-37.

Naming 
The Naranarayan Setu is named after Nara Narayan, a 16th-century Koch king.

See also 
 List of bridges on Brahmaputra River
Godavari Bridge
Saraighat Bridge
List of longest bridges in the world
List of longest bridges above water in India

References 

Bridges in Assam
Bridges over the Brahmaputra River
Bridges completed in 1998
Road-rail bridges in India
Double-decker bridges
Transport in Bongaigaon
20th-century architecture in India